The Bioceanic Corridor (Portuguese: Corredor Bioceânico; Spanish: Corredor Bioceánico)  is a rail project between Brazil, Paraguay, Argentina and Chile. The project would join the port of Santos, Brazil on the coast of the Atlantic Ocean with the port of Iquique and Antofagasta, Chile, on the coast of the Pacific Ocean.

Project 
In his trip to China in 2013, Bolivian president Evo Morales discussed with Xi Jinping, General Secretary of the Chinese Communist Party,  the possibility of building a railway to link the Atlantic with the Pacific through Brazil and Peru. The Chinese president requested a study of feasibility by 2014.

The Spanish narrow gauge rail company, FEVE, was awarded a contract by the Bolivian government to prepare a technical feasibility study. The first studies were prepared by Spanish, French and Bolivian consultants and were to be delivered by June 2014.

In August 2014, a mission from Bolivia sought financing from the Chinese government.

The summit of the Union of South American Nations (Unasur) in December 2014, prioritised the project along with seven other regional integration projects.

The project contemplates four baseline studies: the basic engineering design, the market study, the strategic study and the environmental study. The four studies would be complete by 31 December 2014.

The Bolivian minister of Public Works, Services and House, Vladimir Sánchez, stated the first phase is to build the railroad; the second phase is to electrify the railroad, and a third phase is to have a double-track railroad.

The project looks for 95% of the trade of the south and North of the Peru, as well as the integration to Brazil.

Changes at the project
In August 2017, the 2nd Expedition of the Latin American Integration Route took place, departing from Campo Grande and covering its entire length to the Chilean ports of Iquique and Antofagasta, the final stop. The route passed through 4 countries: Brazil, Paraguay, Argentina and Chile. The 1st Expedition traveled through Bolivia, to Chilean ports. Due to the recent history with the Bolivian government, it was decided that the route should follow via Paraguay and Argentina. The idea is that the corridor will be completed in 2022. Most of the work will be carried out by Paraguay, which will need to pave more than 600 km of its highways, which were still unpaved. The route will cover 2400 km between Campo Grande and Antofagasta. 

The route should reduce the travel time of exports from the Midwest of Brazil to Asia and Oceania (China, Japan, India, Australia) by up to 2 weeks. With the route, part of the Brazilian production, which currently leaves the country through the ports of Santos and Paranaguá, will be exported by Chilean ports at lower prices.

In February 2022, Paraguay inaugurated 275 km of the road (about half of the route), connecting Carmelo Peralta (Alto Paraguay), on the border with Brazil, to Loma Plata (Boquerón), in the center of the country.

See also 
Brazil–Peru railway
Interoceanic Highway 
Rail transport in Bolivia 
Rail transport in Brazil

References 

Proposed railway lines in South America
Proposed railway lines in Brazil
Rail transport in Peru